Monacha obstructa is a species of air-breathing land snail, a terrestrial pulmonate gastropod mollusk in the family Hygromiidae, the hairy snails and their allies.

Distribution 
This species occurs in Egypt and Israel. M. obstructa is also invasive in Saudi Arabia and Qatar.

Parasites 
Parasites of Monacha obstructa include:
 Brachylaima sp. in the kidney of infected snails

References

External links 
 http://www.animalbase.uni-goettingen.de/zooweb/servlet/AnimalBase/home/species?id=2397
 Férussac A. E. J. P. J. F. d'Audebard de 1821-1822. Tableaux systématiques des animaux mollusques classés en familles naturelles, dans lesquels on a établi la concordance de tous les systèmes; suivis d'un prodrome général pour tous les mollusques terrestres ou fluviatiles, vivants ou fossiles. pp. j-xlvij [= 1-47], [1], 1-110, [1]. Paris, Londres. (Bertrand, Sowerby). page 69

Hygromiidae
Gastropods described in 1842